Ericameria ophitidis is a North American species of flowering shrubs in the family Asteraceae. It is native to the northern part of the state of California in the western United States. It has been found only in three counties: Trinity County, western Tehama County, and the southwestern corner of Shasta County. It is called the serpentine goldenbush because it grows on serpentine soil, toxic to many other plants.

Ericameria ophitidis is a shrub up to 30 cm (12 inches or 1 foot) tall. It has narrow, linear leaves up to 15 mm (0.6 inches) long. Flower heads are yellow, solitary or in flat-topped arrays, each head with 5 or 6 disc florets but no ray florets.

References

External links
 Calflora Database: Ericameria ophitidis (Serpentine goldenbush,  Serpentine macronema)
  Jepson eFlora (TJM2): Ericameria ophitidis
 California Native Plant Society, Inventory of Rare and Endangered Plants (online edition, v8-02): Plant Detail for Ericameria ophitidis 
UC Calphotos photos gallery of Ericameria ophitidis

ophitidis
Endemic flora of California
Natural history of the California chaparral and woodlands
Natural history of the California Coast Ranges
Natural history of Shasta County, California
Natural history of Trinity County, California
Tehama County, California
Plants described in 1950
Taxa named by John Thomas Howell
Flora without expected TNC conservation status